The Palatine Ridgeway in the North Palatine Uplands of Germany is  long and has seven recommended day stages. It is the third longest Prädikat path in the Palatinate region after the Palatine Wine Trail and Palatine Forest Trail. The long distance path was opened in autumn 2010. One year later, in September 2011, it was given its status as a Prädikat path.

Route 
The Palatine Ridgeway runs in a semi-circle initially north around the Donnersberg, the highest mountain in the North Palatine Uplands and the whole Palatinate, then through the valleys northwest of the massif. The start point in the east is Winnweiler, the finish point in the west is Wolfstein station. Opened in spring 2011 the hiking trail runs entirely within the North Palatine Uplands. Its waymark and logo, like the other two paths, a hillside in a rectangular field, but with the differences that it is in blue and white, and has a stylised cloud and the name of the path.

Character 
The path, with its climbs and descents, runs through one of the most important tourist attractions of the Palatinate: the large, forested, hill range of the North Palatine Uplands. In addition, the trail runs in places through the valleys of the Alsenz, Moschel, Glan and Lauter, which belong to the river system of the Rhine tributary, the Nahe.

Stations and selected sights

Some of the stations and sights are managed comprehensively by various interest groups.
 Winnweiler
 Chapel of the Cross
 Imsbach
 Weiße Grube visitor mine
 Dannenfels
 Bastenhaus
 Donnersberg summit
 Keltenwall, Ludwigsturm and Donnersberg Transmitter
 Ring of castles around the massif: Falkenstein Tannenfels, Wildenstein, Hohenfels und Ruppertsecken
 Rockenhausen
 Turmuhren Museum
 Obermoschel
 Ruins of "Moschelland Castle"
 Meisenheim
 Historic Altstadt
 Lauterecken
 Schloss Lauterecken
 Wolfstein
 Castles of Alt-Wolfstein and Neu-Wolfstein

References

Literature

External links
 Der Pfälzer Höhenweg
 Pfälzer Höhenweg auf outdooractive mit gpx data

Hiking trails in Rhineland-Palatinate
Palatinate (region)
North Palatinate
European long-distance paths